Pavel Georgyan (born 8 April 1963 in Azokh, Hadrut region, Nagorno-Karabakh, USSR) is a professor, doctor of science in physics and mathematics, corresponding member of Russian Academy of Natural Sciences, Head of Department of Mathematical Analysis of Moscow State Pedagogical University.

Gevorgyan was awarded with the Russian Federation Government Prize in Education (2014).

He is an Honorary Worker of higher professional education of Russian Federation.

Family
Gevorgyan is married and has two children.

Education
In 1980 entered Yerevan State University, Faculty of Mathematics and Mechanics
In 1984 became the winner of Mathematical Olympiad for high school students (Armenia)
In 1984 he transferred to MSU Moscow State University, Department of higher geometry and topology
1985–1989: Postgraduate in Moscow State University, Department of higher geometry and topology
1989: Candidate of Science (equivalent of Ph.D.) in Physics and Mathematics.
Dissertation: “Equivariant movability” (under the supervision of professor Yu.M.Smirnov).
2001: Doctor of Science in Physics and Mathematics
Dissertation: “Generalized shape theory and movability of continuous transformation groups”.

Research area
Topological transformation groups. Equivariant topology. Shape theory.

Career and present positions
1993–1996: Dean of Faculty of Natural Sciences, 1994–1996: Head of Department of Higher Mathematics, 1996–2000: Rector of Artsakh State University (in Nagorno-Karabakh)
2000-2015: Professor of Department of Higher Mathematics of Moscow Power Engineering Institute
2008-2016: Head of Department of Higher and Applied Mathematics of Academy of Labour and Social Relations
2015-2016: Vice-rector of Moscow State Pedagogical University
Since 2015: Head of Department of Mathematical Analysis of Moscow State Pedagogical University
Since 2005: Member of Scientific-Methodological Council on mathematics of Ministry of Education and Science of Russian Federation
2008: Corresponding member of Russian Academy of Natural Sciences
2012: Honorary Worker of Higher Professional Education of Russian Federation

References 

Gevorgyan P.S., Pop I., Movable morphisms in strong shape category. Topology and its Applications, Elsevier BV (Netherlands), 2019, p. 107001.
Геворкян П.С., Хименес Р., Об эквивариантных расслоениях G-CW-комплексов. Математический сборник, 2019, том 210, № 10, с. 91-98.
Геворкян П.С., Теория шейпов. Фундаментальная и прикладная математика, 2019, том 22, № 6, с. 19-84.
Gevorgyan P.S., Iliadis S.D., Groups of generalized isotopies and generalized G-spaces. Matematicki Vesnik, Drustvo Matematicara SR Srbije (Serbia), 2018, 70, № 2, pp. 110–119.
Gevorgyan P.S., Pop I., Shape dimension of maps. Buletinul Academiei de Ştiinţe a Republicii Moldova. Matematica, Vladimir Andrunachievici Institute of Mathematics and Computer Science (Moldova), 2018, 86, № 1, pp. 3–11.
Геворкян П.С., Группы обратимых бинарных операций топологического пространства. Известия НАН Армении: Математика, 2018, № 1, с. 37-44.
Gevorgyan P.S., Pop I., On the n-movability of maps. Topology and its Applications, издательство Elsevier BV (Netherlands), 221(2017), pp. 309–325.
Gevorgyan P.S., Iliadis S.D., Sadovnichy Yu V., Universality on frames. Topology and its Applications, издательство Elsevier BV (Netherlands), 220(2017), pp. 173–188.
Gevorgyan P.S., Groups of binary operations and binary G-spaces. Topology and its Applications, издательство Elsevier BV (Netherlands), 201(2016), pp. 18–28.
Gevorgyan P.S. and Pop I., Movability and uniform movability of shape morphisms. Bulletin Polish Acad. Sci. Math. 64 (2016), 69-83.
Gevorgyan P. S., Groups of binary operations and binary G-spaces. Topology and its Applications. — 2016. — Vol. 201. — P. 18–28.
Gevorgyan P. S. On binary G-spaces. Mathematical Notes. — 2014. — Vol. 96, no. 4. — P. 600–602.
Gevorgyan P. S., Yu.M. Smirnovʼs general equivariant shape theory. Topology and its Applications, Volume 160(2013), pp. 1232–1236.
Gevorgyan P. S., Equivariant movability of topological groups. Topology and its Applications, Volume 159, Issue 7, 15 April 2012, Pages 1761–1766.
Gevorgyan P. S., On equivariant movability of topological groups. 2010 Int. Conf. On Top. And its Appl., Nafpaktos, Greece, p. 108-109.
Gevorgyan P. S., Pop I. Uniformly movable categories and uniform movability of topological spaces. Bull. Polish Acad. Sci. Math., (55) 2007, 229—242.
Gevorgyan P. S., Movable categories. 2006 Int. Conf. On Top. And its Appl., Aegion, Greece, p. 74-75.
Gevorgyan P. S., Some questions of equivariant movability. Glasnik Mat., 39(59)(2004), p. 185—198.
Gevorgyan P. S., Movable categories. Glasnik Mat., 38(58)(2003), p. 177—183.
Gevorgyan P. S., Free equivariant shapes. Sixteenth Summer Conference on Topology and its Applications, July 18–20, 2001, New York, NY, United States.
Gevorgyan P. S., Algebraic characterization of movable spaces. Algebra, Geometry and Applications, 2001, N 1, p. 12-18.
Gevorgyan P. S., On the topological distributive algebras. Int. Conf. On Topology and its Applications, Yokohama, Japan, September 1–3, 1999.
Геворкян П. С., Вопросы эквиваринтной подвижности G-пространств. Вестник МГУ, Сер. 1, Математика. Механика, 2003, № 2, с. 59-63.
Геворкян П. С., Шейповые морфизмы в транзитивные G-пространства. Мат. Заметки, 2002, т. 72, вып. 6, с. 821—827.
Геворкян П. С., Теория K-шейпов. Известия НАН Армении, сер. Математика.
Геворкян П. С., Об одном критерии подвижности. Мат. Заметки, 2002, т. 71, N 2, с. 311—315.
Геворкян П. С., Эквивариантная теорема Фрейденталя и эквивариантная G-подвижность. УМН, 2001, т. 56, вып. 1(337), с. 159—161.
Georgian P. S., An equivariant generalization of Arens-Ellis theorem, Izvestya Natsionalnoi Akademii Nauk Armenii. Matematica, vol. 31, No. 5 (1996), pp. 70–75 (in Russian).
Геворкян П. С., Мажоранты для G-подвижных компактов. УМН, 1989, т. 44, N 1, с. 191—192.
Геворкян П. С., О G-подвижности G-пространства. УМН, 1988, т. 43, N 3, с. 177—178.
Georgian P. S., Linearization of completely regular G-spaces, 5 Tiraspol Symposium on General Topology and Its Applications, (1985), pp. 61–62 (in Russian).

Textbooks on mathematics
Gevorgyan P. S., Higher Mathematics. Principles of Mathematical Analysis. Moscow, Fizmatlit, 2004, 2013. - 240p. (in Russian).
Gevorgyan P. S., Higher Mathematics. Integrals, Series, Complex analysis, Differential Equations. Part 2. Moscow, Fizmatlit, 2007. - 272p. (in Russian).
Gevorgyan P. S., Higher Mathematics. Linear Algebra and Analytic Geometry. Moscow, Fizmatlit, 2007. - 208p. (in Russian).
Petrushko I. M., Gevorgyan P. S., etc., The course of higher mathematics. Series. Moscow, 2009. -173p. (in Russian).
Gevorgyan P. S., Lancova O.Yu., etc., Higher Mathematics for Economists. Moscow, Economika, 2010. - 352p. (in Russian).
Gevorgyan P. S., Bogataya S.I., etc., Problems in Higher Mathematics for Economists. Moscow, Economika, 2010. - 384p. (in Russian).
Gevorgyan P. S., Potemkin A.V., Eysimont I.M., Probability theory and mathematical statistics. Moscow, Economika, 2012. - 208p. (in Russian).
Gevorgyan P. S., Zakaryan V.S., Higher Mathematics. Part I. Yerevan, Editprint, 2009. - 384p. (in Armenian).
Gevorgyan P. S., Zakaryan V.S., Higher Mathematics. Part II. Yerevan, Editprint, 2012. - 464p. (in Armenian).

External links 
Encyclopedia. Russian scientists.

Russian mathematical portal

1963 births
Living people
Yerevan State University alumni
Moscow State University alumni
People from the Republic of Artsakh
Russian physicists
20th-century Russian mathematicians
21st-century Russian mathematicians